Pythagoras was a Greek mathematician and philosopher.

Pythagoras may also refer to:
Pythagoras (boxer) (late 6th century BC), an ancient Greek wrestler from Samos
Pythagoras (sculptor) (fl. 5th century BC), an ancient Greek sculptor from Samos
Pythagoras the Spartan (late 5th century BC to 4th century BC), a mercenary Greek Admiral
Pythagoras, a 4th-century BCE Macedonian hepatomancer mentioned by Arrian, and brother to Apollodorus of Amphipolis
Pythagoras (freedman) (1st century AD), a Roman freedman married to emperor Nero
Pythagoras (crater), a lunar impact crater
Pythagoras ABM, an agent-based model
Pythagoras Papastamatiou or simply Pythagoras, a 20th-century Greek writer
6143 Pythagoras, a main-belt asteroid
Pythagoras Award, is an award given annually to Bulgarian nationals by the Ministry of Science and Education of Bulgaria in recognition for outstanding scientific achievements

See also
Pythagoras tree (fractal), a plane fractal made of squares
Tree of primitive Pythagorean triples
Pythagorean theorem